Niccolò Sommaripa (died ca. 1505) was lord of Paros.

He was lord of Paros and in 1503 attacked Andros, ruled by a different branch of the Sommaripa family. He died ca. 1505, and was succeeded by his son Crusino.

References

Sources
 

1506 deaths
Niccolo
Niccolo
Year of birth unknown